The Saula Blue Springs are freshwater springs located in Saula Village, Kose Parish, Harju County in northern Estonia. The springs are differentiated by their color: Blue Spring (Siniallikas) is blue-green; Black Spring (Mustallikas) is brownish black; and White Spring (Valgeallikas) is blue-gray. The water from the springs flows into the Pirita River.

The springs are protected as a natural monument, as well as a cultural heritage site.

Gallery

References

External links 

 Eesti maaturism: Saula Siniallikad (in Estonian; archived URL)
 Saula Siniallikad EELISes (in Estonian)
 Blue Springs of Saula, Number 18053 in the State Register of Cultural Monuments (in Estonian)

Springs of Estonia
Tourist attractions in Harju County
Kose Parish
Landforms of Harju County